The March 2023 nor'easter is a weather event that took place in North America on March 14, 2023,  in which more than 250,000 buildings were without electricity, as 20-40 inches (51-102 cm) of wet snow fell in Southern Vermont, the Adirondacks, and the Monadnock Region of Southwestern New Hampshire. Larger population centers along the New England coastline were mostly spared from the heaviest snow amounts, but minor wind damage and coastal flooding was still reported in and around Boston.

Preparations 
John Palmer of the National Weather Service office in Gray, Maine stated that the precipitation might cause significant power disruptions that last for over 48 hours.

Kathy Hochul, governor of New York, declared a state of emergency.

References

2023 meteorology
2023 natural disasters in the United States
Blizzards in the United States
Nor'easters
March 2023 events in the United States
Natural disasters in New York (state)